The 2004–05 UAB Blazers men's basketball team represented the University of Alabama at Birmingham as a member of the Conference USA during the 2004–05 NCAA Division I men's basketball season. This was head coach Mike Anderson's third season at UAB, and the Blazers played their home games at Bartow Arena. They finished the season 22–11, 10–6 in C-USA play and lost in the semifinals of the C-USA tournament. They received an at-large bid to the NCAA tournament as No. 11 seed in the Chicago region. The Blazers defeated No. 6 seed LSU in the opening round. In the round of 32, UAB fell to No. 3 seed Arizona, 85–63.

Roster

Schedule and results

|-
!colspan=9 style=| Regular season

|-
!colspan=9 style=| C-USA tournament

|-
!colspan=9 style=| NCAA tournament

Rankings

References

UAB Blazers men's basketball seasons
UAB
UAB